Sri Krishna Devarayalu Lavu (born 29 April 1983) is an Indian politician serving as the member of 17th Lok Sabha. He contested and won in Indian National Elections 2019 from Narasaraopet Constituency representing YSR Congress Party which he joined in 2014. He also serves as the Vice Chairman of Vignan University, a premier university in Andhra Pradesh.

Early life and education
Krishna was born on 29 April 1983. He is the child of Lavu Rathaiah and Lavu Nirmalamma.

He studied Media studies from La Trobe University, Australia and university of California, Santa Barbara.

After education, he took charge as Vice chairman of Vignan's University before foraying into mainstream politics.

Political career 
Sri Krishna Devarayalu Lavu is a first time member of Parliament who contested the 2019 general elections. He won the seat by securing a vote share of 51.83% and by a margin of 1,53,978 votes. He served as a member of the erstwhile Human Resources Development Standing Committee. Since 2021, he has been a member of the Committee of Public Undertakings, Committee on Education, Women, Children, Youth and Sports and Consultative Committee on Animal Husbandry, Dairying and Fisheries. 

He has spoken in Parliament on a range of legislation such as, The Surrogacy (Regulation) Bill, The National Medical Commission Bill, The Motor Vehicles (Amendment) Bill and The Central Universities (Amendment) Bill. He has also raised various issues in Parliament, a few being, the  demand to establish a Chilli Board in Guntur and the Construction of the Varikapudisala Lift Irrigation Project in Andhra Pradesh. He is known for his passionate representation of the people of Andhra Pradesh and Guntur district, having raised several matters of local importance including maintenance of Srisailam Dam, compensation to chillie farmers devastated by thrips and illegal siphoning of Krishna river water. 

In 2021, speaking on the High Court and Supreme Court Judges Amendment Bill, Krishna Lavu discussed the need for a centralized Judicial exam and a 'cooling off' period for the judiciary. Regarding the Election Laws Amendment Bill, 2021 he brought up mass disenfranchisement in Andhra Pradesh among other points. He is an active participant in the affairs of the House and has also brought the unmet needs of the people of Andhra Pradesh to the notice of the Central Government through his speech on the Budget in 2022.

References 

Living people
YSR Congress Party politicians
India MPs 2019–present
Lok Sabha members from Andhra Pradesh
Andhra Pradesh politicians
1983 births